This is a list of countries of the world by wealth per adult or household, from sources such as Credit Suisse's annual Global Wealth Databook and the OECD's Better Life Index. Wealth includes both financial and non-financial assets.

Credit Suisse Global Wealth Databook's list of countries by wealth per adult (USD) 
Credit Suisse publishes various statistics relevant for calculating net wealth. These figures are influenced by real estate prices, equity market prices, exchange rates, liabilities, debts, adult percentage of the population, human resources, natural resources and capital and technological advancements, which may create new assets or render others worthless in the future.

During periods of equity market growth, the relative national and per capita wealth of countries where people are more exposed to those markets, such as the United States and the United Kingdom, tends to rise. But when equity markets are down, the relative wealth of countries where people invest more in real estate or bonds, such as France and Italy, tends to rise instead. Countries with older populations, like Germany and Italy, would have higher relative wealth, if calculated per capita and not per adult.

Mean wealth is the amount obtained by dividing the total aggregate wealth by the number of adults. Median wealth is the amount that divides the population into two equal groups: half the adults have wealth above the median, and the other half below. In nations where wealth is highly concentrated in a small percentage of people, the mean can be much higher than the median (e.g. the United States). To see this, click on the header of the median wealth column and put it in descending order.

By region 
* indicates "Economy of LOCATION" links.

By country 

Gini: Higher Gini coefficients signify greater inequality in wealth distribution, with 0 being complete equality, whereas a value near 100% can arise in a situation where everybody has zero wealth except a very small minority.

* indicates "Wealth in LOCATION" or "Economy of LOCATION" links.

More countries (rough estimates) 
For some countries, Credit Suisse could not provide mean or median wealth numbers. For those countries they only provide "GDP per adult" numbers.

* indicates "Wealth in LOCATION" or "Economy of LOCATION" links.

OECD's list of countries by household wealth (USD) 

* indicates "Wealth in LOCATION" or "Economy of LOCATION" links.

See also
Wealth distribution by country
Wealth distribution in Europe
Financial and social rankings of sovereign states in Europe
High-net-worth individual
List of countries by financial assets per capita
List of countries by GDP (PPP) per capita
List of countries by GNI (nominal) per capita
List of countries by income equality
List of countries by total wealth
National wealth
Ultra high-net-worth individual
Wealth inequality in the United States
Wealth

References

External links

 Where is the Wealth of Nations, World Bank 2006
 Animated Chart: Which Countries Have the Most Wealth Per Capita?

Navigation boxes

Wealth